Hans Gildemeister and Víctor Pecci were the defending champions, but Pecci did not compete this year.

Gildemeister teamed up with Andrés Gómez and successfully defended his title, by defeating Ricardo Acioly and César Kist 6–3, 7–5 in the final.

Seeds
The first four seeds received a bye into the second round.

Draw

Finals

Top half

Bottom half

References

External links
 Official results archive (ATP)
 Official results archive (ITF)

1986 Grand Prix (tennis)